Esa Bin Obaid Misri is an Indian professional bodybuilder from Hyderabad, Telangana State, India who won multiple titles in both state and national championships. The highest title he won was the Silver medallist at the 2016 Mr Universe Championship in the heavy weight category of 90 kg. He recently contested against AIMIM's Akbaruddin Owaisi.

Titles
Mr. Hyderabad (2009)
Mr. Pride of Hyderabad (2014)
Mr. Andhra Pradesh (9 times)
Mr. India (2009)
Mr. Universe (2015)
Mr. MuscleMania World (2015)

Early life and education
Born in Hyderabad, India to Obaid Bin Ali Misri and Taqiya Begum, Esa Misri was student of Kilpatrik Mission School. He is of Chaush ancestry.

He owns a gym with the name Misri gym and a function hall named Noori Palace Function hall located in Bandlaguda Chandrayan Gutta, Hyderabad.

Political career 
He joined the Indian National Congress and contested as a candidate for the Chandrayangutta constituency in the 2018 elections.

References

External links 

1971 births
Living people
Professional bodybuilders
Sportspeople from Hyderabad, India
Indian bodybuilders